In mathematics, a topological module is a module over a topological ring such that scalar multiplication and addition are continuous.

Examples

A topological vector space is a topological module over a topological field.

An abelian topological group can be considered as a topological module over  where  is the ring of integers with the discrete topology.

A topological ring is a topological module over each of its subrings.

A more complicated example is the -adic topology on a ring and its modules. Let  be an ideal of a ring  The sets of the form  for all  and all positive integers  form a base for a topology on  that makes  into a topological ring. Then for any left -module  the sets of the form  for all  and all positive integers  form a base for a topology on  that makes  into a topological module over the topological ring

See also

References

 

Algebra
Topology
Topological algebra
Topological groups